New Beni Suef is a city in the Beni Suef Governorate, Egypt. The city is located east of Old Beni Suef and lies on the Nile river. The city was constructed by the New Urban Communities Authority. Its population was estimated at 31,000 people in 2020.

References 

Populated places in Beni Suef Governorate
Cities in Egypt
New towns in Egypt